Cryptids are animals that cryptozoologists believe may exist somewhere in the wild, but are not recognized by science. Cryptozoology is a pseudoscience, which primarily looks at anecdotal stories, and other claims rejected by the scientific community. While biologists regularly identify new species following established scientific methodology, cryptozoologists focus on entities mentioned in the folklore record and rumor. Entities that may be considered cryptids by cryptozoologists include Bigfoot, Yeti, the chupacabra, the Jersey Devil, the Loch Ness Monster, and the Mokele-mbembe. 

Scholars have noted that the cryptozoology subculture rejected mainstream approaches from an early date, and that adherents often express hostility to mainstream science. Scholars have studied cryptozoologists and their influence (including the pseudoscience's association with Young Earth creationism), noted parallels in cryptozoology and other pseudosciences such as ghost hunting and ufology, and highlighted uncritical media propagation of cryptozoologist claims.

List

Aquatic or semi-aquatic

Terrestrial

Flying

See also 
 Animalia Paradoxa
 Fearsome critters
 Legendary creature
 List of cryptozoologists
 Lists of legendary creatures
 List of megafauna discovered in modern times
 List of urban legends

References

Bibliography

External links 
 
 

Lists of legendary creatures